The Monterey Bay National Marine Sanctuary (MBNMS) is a federally protected marine area offshore of California's  Big Sur and central coast in the United States. It is the largest US national marine sanctuary and has a shoreline length of  stretching from just north of the Golden Gate Bridge at San Francisco to Cambria in San Luis Obispo County. Supporting one of the world's most diverse marine ecosystems, it is home to numerous mammals, seabirds, fishes, invertebrates and plants in a remarkably productive coastal environment. The MBNMS was established in 1992 for the purpose of resource protection, research, education, and public use.

Description

The Monterey Bay National Marine Sanctuary (MBNMS) is one of the largest of a system of 14 National Marine Sanctuaries administered by the National Oceanic and Atmospheric Administration (NOAA), within the U.S. Department of Commerce. Its area is 6,094 square statute miles or 4,024 square nautical miles.

The sanctuary provides habitat for 36 species of marine mammals, 94 species of seabirds, at least 525 species of fish, four of turtles, 31 phyla of invertebrates, and more than 450 species of marine algae. Historical sites include 1,276 reported shipwrecks and 718 prehistoric sites. The MBNMS has major programs for research and monitoring, and another for education and outreach. Public recreation activities such as kayaking, SCUBA diving, and surfing are permitted, along with commercial fishing. Oil drilling and seabed mining are banned to protect the sanctuary. The sanctuary provides economic value via ecotourism as well as fishery resources including the Dungeness crab and market squid. Otter trawling has been shown to have significantly negatively impact the benthic invertebrate biodiversity in areas where trawling is less restricted. Despite its protection as a National Marine Sanctuary MPA, a study found microplastic concentrations were higher than the global average, with a higher amount closer to shore.

Visitors centers

A Coastal Discovery Center is located across the Pacific Coast Highway from the Hearst Castle visitor's center in San Simeon, California near the William Randolph Hearst Memorial State Beach.

The Monterey Bay Marine Sanctuary Exploration Center opened on July 23, 2012 at 35 Pacific Ave. in Santa Cruz, CA.

Collaborations
MBNMS collaborations include:

 The Sanctuary Advisory Council's twenty voting members represent a variety of local user groups, as well as the general public, plus seven local and state governmental jurisdictions. In addition, the respective managers for the four California National Marine Sanctuaries (Channel Islands National Marine Sanctuary, Cordell Bank National Marine Sanctuary, Gulf of the Farallones National Marine Sanctuary, and the Monterey Bay National Marine Sanctuary), the Elkhorn Slough National Estuarine Research Reserve and the United States Coast Guard sit as non-voting members. Members are appointed competitively by the National Oceanic and Atmospheric Administration and serve three-year terms. The Advisory Council meets bi-monthly in open sessions located throughout the almost 300-mile boundary of the Sanctuary.
 Working groups of the council: Research Activities Panel, Sanctuary Education Panel, Conservation Working Group, Business & Tourism Activities Panel
 Regional partnerships
 B-WET (Bay Watershed Education and Training Program): a grant program to provide funding and support for environmental education for students, teachers, and communities throughout the Monterey Bay watershed.

Events and activities 

See the MBNMS event calendar for a list of meetings, as well as volunteer events such as Snapshot Day, Urban Watch, First Flush (water quality monitoring programs), and TeamOCEAN (kayaker naturalist program).

The organization launched the Sanctuary Integrated Monitoring Network (SIMoN) website in 2003 to collect metadata for its various monitoring projects. In 2012, this information was released as an iOS application to allow visitors better access to the over 4,200 photos that have been collected.

History

A Marine Sanctuaries Study Bill was first proposed in 1967 with lobbying efforts by the Sierra Club. The Marine Protection, Research, and Sanctuaries Act of 1972 authorized the United States Environmental Protection Agency to monitor off-shore dumping. In 1975, the California Coastal Zone Conservation Commission recommended a marine sanctuary and in 1976 Santa Cruz County and Monterey County joined the lobbying effort. In 1983 the Ronald Reagan administration dropped the area for consideration as a sanctuary.

In 1988 congress re-authorized the Sanctuaries Act and proposed a sanctuary in Monterey Bay. However, public hearings, with the memory of the 1969 Santa Barbara oil spill, brought protests demanding a larger size. The first Draft Environmental Impact Statement was released in 1990, and a final management plan in June 1992 proposing the extended area. On September 20, 1992, the MBNMS was authorized by legislation proposed by congressman Leon Panetta. It was the largest federal marine sanctuary.

Management
There have been five Superintendents of the MBNMS since its inception:

 Terry Jackson (1992 to 1997):  Jackson was a NOAA Corps officer that was assigned to the MBNMS as its first manager in 1992. As a NOAA Corps officer, Jackson's land-based assignment ended in 1997. Over the next year, Jackson hired the first MBNMS staffers. Jackson retired from the NOAA Corps in 1998.
 Carol Fairfield (June and July 1997): A call for Superintendent applicants went out in the spring of 1997. However, that process was ended by the National Marine Sanctuaries Chief, Stephanie Thornton, because she "did not believe any of the current applicants had the skills she was looking for to be the MBNMS Superintendent." The call for applicants was re-advertised, and Carol Fairfield (with the NOAA's NMFS Protected Resources Program) was selected. Fairfield was selected in June and spent her first month at the Sanctuary Headquarters in Silver Spring, Maryland. Fairfield was reassigned on July 28, 1997, and Thornton said "Fairfield¹s reassignment is a personnel matter which cannot be discussed in detail."
 Joanne Flanders (1997): At the time of Jackson's departure, Joanne Flanders (another NOAA Corps Officer) was Assistant Superintendent. Flanders was appointed Acting Superintendent for about six months.
 William J. Douros (1998 to 2006): In January 1998 William J. Douros, who had previously worked for Santa Barbara County became superintendent.
 Paul Michel (2007 to Present): In 2006 Douros was promoted to West Coast regional director for the National Marine Sanctuary Program. Paul Michel, who had worked at the Environmental Protection Agency since 1987, became superintendent.

Management of northern section
Since the Gulf of the Farallones National Marine Sanctuary (GFNMS) had been established earlier and had a staff already, the section north of Año Nuevo point near the San Mateo County line was managed by GFNMS from its office in San Francisco. By 1996, Terry Jackson of MBNMS requested to have the management boundaries match the preserve. Ed Ueber of GFNMS saw no reason to change.

Oil and gas reserves 

There are oil and gas reserves off the coast, but exploration has not been permitted. In 1982, Interior Secretary James G. Watt proposed opening the Central California coast outer continental shelf to oil and gas exploration. California residents and politicians strongly opposed the proposal and it was defeated. In 1990, President George H. W. Bush used an obscure 1953 law to permanently ban oil and gas development in California's Monterey Bay. In late December 2016, President Obama used the same law to ban oil exploration from Hearst Castle to Point Arena in Mendocino County, California.

In July 2017, under the direction of Executive Order 13795 from President Donald Trump, the U.S. Department of Commerce began re-evaluating the protected status of the sanctuary, which includes the Davidson Seamount off the coast of Big Sur. Opening the area to oil and gas exploration was opposed by many environmentalists and residents.

Related protection areas
A large number of protected areas have overlapping jurisdictions. From roughly from north to south: 

 Gulf of the Farallones National Marine Sanctuary adjacent to the north
 Golden Gate National Recreation Area
 San Francisco Bay National Estuarine Research Reserve
 Fitzgerald Marine Reserve
 Half Moon Bay State Beach
 San Gregorio State Beach
 Pomponio State Beach
 Pescadero State Beach
 Bean Hollow State Beach
 Pigeon Point Light Station State Historic Park
 Año Nuevo State Marine Conservation Area
 Año Nuevo State Reserve
 Theodore J. Hoover Natural Preserve
 Greyhound Rock State Marine Conservation Area
 Natural Bridges State Beach
 Lighthouse Field State Beach
 Twin Lakes State Beach
 New Brighton State Beach
 Seacliff State Beach
 Manresa State Beach
 Sunset State Beach
 Santa Cruz harbor
 Zmudowski State Beach
 Moss Landing State Beach
 Moss Landing Wildlife Area
 Elkhorn Slough National Estuarine Research Reserve
 Salinas River State Beach
 Salinas River National Wildlife Refuge
 Marina State Beach
 Monterey State Beach
 Edward F. Ricketts State Marine Conservation Area
 Lovers Point State Marine Reserve
 Asilomar State Marine Reserve
 Asilomar State Beach
 Carmel Pinnacles State Marine Reserve
 Carmel Bay State Marine Conservation Area
 Point Lobos  State Marine Reserve and State Marine Conservation Area
 Pfeiffer Big Sur State Park
 Los Padres National Forest
 Julia Pfeiffer Burns State Park
 Big Creek State Marine Reserve and Big Creek State Marine Conservation Area
 Cambria State Marine Conservation Area
 William Randolph Hearst Memorial State Beach
 San Simeon State Park
 White Rock (Cambria) State Marine Conservation Area

Gallery

References

Further reading
  Ph.D. dissertation

External links

Live HD Web Cam of the Monterey Bay National Marine Sanctuary
California's MPAs
Monterey Bay National Marine Sanctuary

Marine sanctuaries in California
National Marine Sanctuaries of the United States
Protected areas of Marin County, California
Protected areas of San Francisco
Protected areas of San Mateo County, California
Protected areas of Santa Cruz County, California
Protected areas of Monterey County, California
Protected areas of San Luis Obispo County, California
Monterey Bay
Natural history of San Francisco